The Trinity Monastery of St. Jonas is a Ukrainian Orthodox monastery in the Kyivan neighbourhood of Zvirynets, a short distance from the medieval Vydubychi Monastery.

It was Jonas, a Vydubychi hegumen, who founded this monastery in 1864. Princess Vasilchikov, the widow of Kyiv's Governor General, decided to support the undertaking and presented her dacha to the brethren. It was on these grounds that the katholikon was constructed. The monastery's bell tower, at 110 meters, was to be the tallest in the Orthodox world. Its construction was halted due to the outbreak of World War I. As many as 800 monks resided there at the time.

The monastery was closed in 1934 and its grounds were taken over by the M.M. Gryshko National Botanical Garden. The monks of the recently revived monastery now help to restore the nearby Zvirynets caves.

References 

Eastern Orthodox monasteries in Ukraine
Buildings and structures in Kyiv
Churches completed in 1871
1864 establishments in the Russian Empire